Scythris hologramma is a moth in the family Scythrididae. It is found in Australia (including New South Wales).

References

Natural History Museum Lepidoptera generic names catalog

hologramma